Terrence L. "Terry" Blair (November 23, 1946 – June 26, 2014) was a member of the Ohio House of Representatives, serving the 38th District from 2009 to 2014.

Career
A graduate of Notre Dame and Loyola, Blair formerly served as a Washington Township trustee. He also served as the President of Buckeye Pools, Incorporated before retiring

Ohio House of Representatives
When incumbent Representative John White was term limited, Blair was one of two who sought to replace him. In the 2008 primary, Blair faced Dayton resident Tom Young, and went on to defeat him by 1,400 votes.  He went on to easily win the general election, and reelection in 2010. He later served on the committees of Commerce and Labor, Financial Institutions, Housing, and Urban Development, Local Government (as Chairman), and Ways and Means.

Blair won reelection with 65.64% of the vote in 2012 over Democrat Aaron Buczkowski.

Death
On June 26, 2014, it was reported that Blair had died, according to Ohio GOP officials.

References

External links
Votesmart.org.-Terry Blair
Terry Blair for State Representative campaign website

2014 deaths
Republican Party members of the Ohio House of Representatives
1946 births
People from La Porte, Indiana
People from Montgomery County, Ohio
University of Notre Dame alumni
Loyola University Chicago alumni
Businesspeople from Ohio
21st-century American politicians
20th-century American businesspeople